Košarkaški klub Hercegovac, commonly referred to as KK Hercegovac, is a men's basketball club based in Gajdobra, near Bačka Palanka, Vojvodina, Serbia. They are currently competing in the Second Basketball League of Serbia.

The club bears its name after an ethnonym Herzegovinian.

History 
The club was formed in April 2019, bearing the same name of the club dissolved in 2002. In their first competition, the club won the 2019 Vojvodina Summer League (5th-tier) and got qualified to the Second Regional League for the 2019–20 season. In the 2020–21 season, the club won the 3rd-tier First Regional League – North Division and got qualified to the Second League of Serbia for the 2021–22 season.

Players 

  Božo Đumić
  Vladimir Ivelja
  Aleksa Zarić

Head coaches 

  Radomir Kisić (2019–2022)
  Miloš Luburić (2022–present)

Trophies and awards

Trophies
 First Regional League, North Division (3rd-tier)
 Winners (1): 2020–21

References

External links
 Profile at eurobasket.com
 Profile at srbijasport.net 
 

Hercegovac
Hercegovac
Hercegovac
Sport in Vojvodina
Bačka Palanka